The 1987 FIFA U-16 World Championship, the second edition of the tournament, was hosted by Canada and held in the cities of Montreal, Saint John, St. John's, and Toronto between 12 July and 25 July 1987. Players born after 1 August 1970 could participate in this tournament.

Venues
The cities of Montreal, Saint John, St. John's, and Toronto hosted tournament matches.

Qualified teams

Squads

For full squad lists for the 1987 U-16 World Championship see 1987 FIFA U-16 World Championship Squads.

Referees

Asia
  Itzhak Ben Itzhak
  Ibrahim Al-Jassas
  Lee Do-Ha
  Jassim Mandi
Africa
  Simon Bantsimba
  Mohamed Hafez
  Naji Jouini
North America, Central America and the Caribbean
  Arturo Brizio Carter
  David DiPlacido
  Antonio Evangelista
  Berny Ulloa Morera

South America
  Jorge Orellano
  Juan Ortube
  José Roberto Wright
Europe
  John Blankenstein
  Kenny Hope
  Alexey Spirin
Oceania
  Ken Wallace

Group stage

Group A
Venue: Varsity Stadium, Toronto

Group B
Venue: King George V Park, St. John's

Group C
Venue: Complexe sportif Claude-Robillard, Montreal

Group D
Venue: Jeux Canada Games Stadium, Saint John

Knockout stages

Quarterfinals

Semifinals

Playoff for 3rd place

Final

Result

Goalscorers

Moussa Traoré of Ivory Coast won the Golden Shoe award for scoring five goals. In total, 82 goals were scored by 54 different players, with none of them credited as own goal.

5 goals
 Moussa Traoré
 Yuri Nikiforov
4 goals
 Philip Osondu
 Sergei Arutyunian
3 goals
 Mickaël Debève
 Fabio Gallo
2 goals

 Luis Cristaldo
 Massimiliano Cappellini
 Michel Bassole
 Christopher Nwosu
 Shin Tae-Yong
 Anatoly Mushinka
 Mirdjalal Kasimov
 Nikolai Rusin
 Oleh Matveyev
 Serhiy Bezhenar

1 goal

 Phillip Richardson
 Steve Georgakis
 Steve Horvat
 Hebert Arandia
 Manuel Lobo
 Marco Etcheverry
 Marcos Urquiza
 Guido Titotto
 Victor Ramos
 Gamal Musaed
 Hany Hussain
 Mohamed Ramadan
 David Rincon
 Gilles Adrian
 Stephane Roche
 Carlo Bocchialini
 Gianluca Pessotto
 Marcello Melli
 Beda Beda
 Lama Dea
 Carlos Rivera
 Daniel Landa
 Ramiro Romero
 Albert Eke
 Abdulla Hassan
 Abdulla Yousuf
 Edress Khairi
 Rashid Suwaid
 Mohammed Shalgan
 Turki Zayed
 Kim In-Wan
 Lee Tae-Hong
 Noh Jung-Yoon
 Vladislav Kadyrov
 Arif Asadov
 Ben Crawley
 Chad Deering
 Steve Snow

Final ranking

FIFA awarded the Golden Boot to Moussa Traoré because Côte d'Ivoire had scored fewer goals than USSR.

External links
FIFA U-16 World Championship Canada 1987, FIFA.com
Technical Report (Part 1) and (Part 2)

FIFA
FIFA U-16 World Championship
International association football competitions hosted by Canada
Soccer in Ontario
Soccer in Quebec
Soccer in Newfoundland and Labrador
Soccer in New Brunswick
FIFA U-17 World Cup tournaments
1980s in Montreal
1987 in Quebec
1987 in Toronto
July 1987 sports events in Canada
International sports competitions in Toronto